Lygropia ochracealis is a moth of the family Crambidae described by Max Saalmüller in 1880. It is found on Madagascar.

This species is of yolk-yellow colour with blackish-brown markings. The wingspan of this species is about 28 mm.

References

Moths described in 1880
Lygropia
Moths of Madagascar
Moths of Africa